Bill Erskine Butchart (15 April 1933 – 1 April 2019) was an Australian middle-distance runner. He competed in the men's 800 metres at the 1956 Summer Olympics.

References

External links
 

1933 births
2019 deaths
Athletes (track and field) at the 1956 Summer Olympics
Australian male middle-distance runners
Olympic athletes of Australia
Place of birth missing
20th-century Australian people